Bharatsinhji Dabhi is a Member of Legislative assembly from Kheralu constituency in Gujarat for its 12th, 13th and 14th legislative assembly.

He was elected to the Lok Sabha, lower house of the Parliament of India from Patan, Gujarat in the 2019 Indian general election as member of the Bharatiya Janata Party.

References

India MPs 2019–present
Lok Sabha members from Gujarat
Living people
Gujarat MLAs 2017–2022
Gujarat MLAs 2007–2012
Gujarat MLAs 2012–2017
People from Mehsana district
Bharatiya Janata Party politicians from Gujarat
1955 births